Lost and Gone Forever is the third studio album by the band Guster, released in September 1999. It was recorded earlier that year in Sausalito, California, and Bearsville, New York. In 1999, Ryan Miller claimed that Guster took the album's title "from the popular folk song 'Oh My Darling, Clementine and "chose it because we felt it reflected the lyrical content of the record." According to Guster's own website, other titles considered for the album included (jokingly) 'The Ides of Guster', 'When Guster Attacks', 'Senior Week' and 'Book on Tape'. All of the drums on this album were played by hand (no sticks).

In February 2012, Paste magazine named Lost and Gone Forever the 79th greatest album of the 1990s.

Track listing
All songs written by Ryan Miller.
"What You Wish for" – 3:51
"Barrel of a Gun" – 3:11
"Either Way" – 4:43
"Fa Fa" – 4:43
"I Spy" – 2:57
"Center of Attention" – 4:07
"All the Way up to Heaven" – 5:00
"Happier" – 3:52
"So Long" – 2:38
"Two Points for Honesty" – 3:32
"Rainy Day" – 5:23

Personnel
Guster

Adam Gardner - vocals, guitar, bass guitar, trumpet
Ryan Miller - vocals, guitar, piano, organ, harmonica
Brian Rosenworcel - drums, percussion, trombone, typewriter

Guest musicians
Alicia Berger, Chonie De Ocampo, Katherine Forgacs, Emily Martinez, Kristen Randall, Lisa Williams - whistling (on "All The Way up to Heaven")
Karl Denson - flute, saxophone (on "Fa Fa")
Tony Levin - bass guitar (on "Fa Fa" and "Rainy Day"), Chapman stick (on "Two Points for Honesty")
Chris Manning - bass guitar (on "What You Wish For" and "Barrel of a Gun")
Page McConnell - theremin (on "All The Way up to Heaven")
Dan Rieter - cello (on "Either Way" and "So Long")
Tracy Silverman - violin, viola (on "Either Way)

Charts
Album - Billboard (United States)

Singles - Billboard (United States)

References 

1999 albums
Guster albums
Sire Records albums
Albums produced by Steve Lillywhite